Gandhinagar 2nd Street is a 1986 Indian Malayalam-language comedy drama film directed by Sathyan Anthikad and written by Sreenivasan from a story by Anthikad. It stars Mohanlal in the lead role, with Karthika, Seema, Sreenivasan, Thilakan, Innocent, Sukumari and K. P. A. C. Lalitha in supporting roles. The film also has Mammootty in a Cameo appearance. The music was composed by Shyam. The film was remade in Telugu as Gandhinagar Rendava Veedhi (1987) and in Tamil as Annanagar Mudhal Theru (1988).

Plot

Madhavan is trying to get a job for his unemployed friend Sethu. When a spate of robberies takes place in a middle-class neighbourhood, Madhavan has Sethu pose as Ram Singh, a Nepali émigré, to fulfil the residents' need for a Gorkha security guard. He befriends Nirmala, a preschool teacher. Meanwhile, a police officer and his daughter, Maya, move into the neighbourhood, bringing back memories from the past for Sethu.

Three years before, Sethu and Maya were friends and later they fell in love with each other. But, they separated due to some misunderstandings. Sethu apologies to Maya, but Maya does not reciprocate. Nirmala also finds the real identity of Sethu and his relationship with Maya. Tomy, a neighbour, misbehaves with Maya and Sethu beats him.

The colony's residents turns against Ram Singh after the incident and suspects that Nirmala has an affair with him. Nirmala's husband Balachandran returns from Dubai and the colony's residents gossip about the relationship between Sethu and Nirmala. Balachandran says that he trusts his wife and that his wife has send letters about Sethu. Balachandran visit Maya's father and learns that she is actually a widow. Balachandran has also arranged a job for Sethu abroad and when he is returning he will also take Sethu to Dubai. The movie ends with Maya and Sethu uniting.

Cast

Mohanlal as Sethu, a security guard and story protagonist / Ram Singh
Karthika as Maya
Seema as Nirmala
Sreenivasan as Madhavan, Sethu's friend
Thilakan as Maya's father, a brash policeman 
Sukumari as Mrs. Varkey, Colony Secretary
C. I. Paul as Varkey
K. P. A. C. Lalitha as Bharathi
Sankaradi as Kuttichan
Innocent as Police Constable 
Santhakumari as Madhavan's mother
Janardhanan
Ashokan as Tomy, a flirtatious young man who likes to woo girls he meets. 
Mamukkoya 
Augustine
Mammootty as Balachandran (Cameo appearance)

Soundtrack
The music was composed by Shyam and the lyrics were written by Bichu Thirumala.

Remakes
The film was remade in Telugu as Gandhinagar Rendava Veedhi (1987) directed by P. N. Ramachandra Rao and starring Rajendra Prasad, and in Tamil as Annanagar Mudhal Theru (1988) directed by Balu Anand and starring Sathyaraj.

References

External links
 

1986 comedy-drama films
1980s Malayalam-language films
Indian comedy-drama films
Films with screenplays by Sreenivasan
Films scored by Shyam (composer)
Films directed by Sathyan Anthikad
Malayalam films remade in other languages
Films shot in Kozhikode
1986 comedy films
1986 drama films
1986 films